
Padang Besar may refer to:

Places

Towns
 Padang Besar, Malaysia, a town on the Malaysian side of the Malaysia-Thailand border
 Padang Besar, Thailand, a town on the Thai side of the Malaysia-Thailand border

Railway Stations
Padang Besar railway station, a railway station in Padang Besar, Malaysia which is the railway border crossing between Malaysia and Thailand
Padang Besar (Thai) railway station, a minor railway station in Padang Besar, Thailand

Voting district 
 Padang Besar (federal constituency), a voting district or constituency of the Dewan Rakyat of the Malaysian Parliament

Other
 Padang Besar, a 2012 Thai film known in English as I Carried You Home